Barbara Segal is a sculptor and stone carver based in Yonkers, New York.

Early life and education 

Segal studied at Pratt Institute in New York City in the early 1970s and spent two years at the L'Ècole des Beaux-Arts in Paris. She worked in fine marble studios in Italy such as Tommasi Fonderia and SGF Studio Scultura, and with Jacques Lipshitz, Augustin Cárdenas, and Max Bill. She returned to New York in the late 70's and made product models for Avon Cosmetics in the 1980s.

Work and career 
Barbara Segal creates sculptures carved from stone such as marble, onyx, and calcite. She uses traditional carving tools such as chisels  and stone cutters and acquires material from stone quarries all over the globe. Her work was inspired by the textures and patterns of the Renaissance and Baroque sculptures she saw while studying in France and Italy. In her TedX talk, she speaks on being inspired by cathedrals and the fact that she could see the hand of the artist in these architecture works. She re-recreates pop and fashion icons such as a Louis Vuitton handbag and a Chanel gift bag in stone. Her work explores society's fascination with status symbols and the impact they have on culture. By turning these cultural objects into 100-pound sculptures made from stone, Segal transforms them into the semblance of a historic relic. One of her larger pieces is a 3 foot tall Chanel bag that weighs 2,000 pounds.

She has held solo exhibitions at The Neuberger Museum of Art, the Hudson River Museum, and Vassar College.

Segal teaches Sculpture at New York Academy of Art and at the School of Visual Arts in New York City. She also teaches workshops at her art studio in New York.

Public art 
Segal worked alongside a group of artists to create the Yonkers Sculpture Meadow in 2003. Heading the project, her works for the Sculpture Meadow include functional furniture carved from stone titled Cloud Couch and Cloud Loveseat. Other artworks in the Sculpture Meadow include Susan Abraham's 'River Bedroom, Lou Lalli's Fish Loveseat, and Paul Greco's Meditation Circle. On organizing this project, Segal states "If you're going to make art in public places, it's not a bad idea to make it functional. This way we're giving the community something it needs anyway.''In 2005, she created a sculpture 72 feet long and 4 1/2 feet wide made of two cast aluminum reliefs called Muhheakantuck (The River that Flows Two Ways) that were installed on the bridge at Yonkers Station. The title, Muhheakantuck , is the name for the Hudson River used by the indigenous peoples that lived in this region before European settlement. The sculptures are abstract representations of the Hudson River. Segal has spoken on her interests in "unearthing that history and telling us its story through sculpture".

Social practice 
Segal founded a Yonkers-based non-profit arts organization called Art on Main Street and was the executive director. This organization brought art to downtown Yonkers and was involved in the revitalization of the waterfront in the city. Segal founded Yonkers Arts in 2007 with a mission of community development and promoting the arts in Yonkers.

Awards 
She was awarded a Housing and Urban Development grant in 1995, a Mayoral Citation in 2007, an America for the Arts Award in 2008, a Yonkers Visionary Award in 2015, a New York State Assembly and Senate citations in 2015.

Collections 
Segal's work is in the collection at the MTA Arts for Transit, New York City Department of Parks and Recreation, the White House, the Neuberger Museum of Art and the private collections of Leslie Wexler and Malcolm Forbes.

References

External links 

Barbara Segal Ted X
Interview with the Curator's Salon
Creation of Yonkers Sculpture Meadow and Muhheakantuck

American artisans
American artists
American women sculptors
Artists from New York City
American educators
American women educators
People from New York City
People from Yonkers, New York
Pratt Institute alumni
Sculptors from New York (state)
Stone carvers
American stonemasons
American women artists
Women stone carvers